The 2010 Kansas gubernatorial election was held on November 2, 2010. Incumbent Governor Mark Parkinson, who assumed office when previous Governor Kathleen Sebelius was sworn in as the United States Secretary of Health and Human Services on April 28, 2009, declined to seek election to a full term. United States Senator Sam Brownback, who unsuccessfully ran for president in 2008, emerged as the Republican nominee, facing off against Democratic State Senator Tom Holland, who was unopposed for his party's nomination. Owing to the large amount of popularity that he had accumulated during his tenure in the United States Senate, Brownback defeated Holland in a landslide to become the 46th Governor of Kansas.

Democratic primary

Candidates
 Tom Holland, Kansas State Senator

Results

Republican primary

Announced
 Sam Brownback, United States Senator
 Joan Heffington, businesswoman

Polling

Results

General election

Predictions

Polling

Results

References

External links
 Elections at the Kansas Secretary of State
 Kansas Governor Candidates at Project Vote Smart
 2010 Kansas Governor General Election: Sam Brownback (R) vs Tom Holland (D) graph of multiple polls from Pollster.com
 Election 2010: Kansas Governor from Rasmussen Reports
 2010 Kansas Governor – Brownback vs. Holland from Real Clear Politics
 2010 Kansas Governor's Race from CQ Politics
 Campaign contributions for 2010 Kansas Governor from Follow the Money
 Race Profile in The New York Times
 News coverage from The Midwest Democracy Project at The Kansas City Star
Official campaign sites (Archived) 
 Sam Brownback
 Ken Cannon
 Andrew Gray
 Joan Heffington
 Heath Norris

Gubernatorial
2010
2010 United States gubernatorial elections